The Netherlands competed at the 2008 Summer Paralympics in Beijing.

A total of 83 Dutch competitors took part in 13 sports. The athletes that qualified for the 2008 Summer Paralympics are listed below.

Medalists

Archery

1 competitor:

Women

Athletics

8 competitors:

Men

Women

Cycling

5 competitors (+ 1 pilot):

Men
Time trials & Road races

Pursuits

Women

Equestrian

4 competitors:

Individual

Team

'#' denotes scores that did not count toward the team total.

Football (7-a-side)

12 competitors:

 Bart Adelaars
 Rudy van Breemen
 Jeffrey Bruinier
 Patrick van Kempen
 Stephan Lokhoff
 Joey Mense
 Thieu van Son
 Pawel Statema
 Dennis Straatman
 John Swinkels
 Martijn van de Ven
 Jeroen Voogd

Preliminary round - Group A

Group table

Classification round

5th place match

Judo

1 competitor:

Women

Rowing

5 competitors (plus 1 cox):

Marleen Sanderse acted as a reserve for the coxed four.

Sailing

1 competitor:

CAN - Race cancelled

Sitting volleyball

10 competitors:

Women

 Sanne Bakker
 Karin van der Haar-Kramp
 Karin Harmsen-Roosen
 Paula List
 Djoke van Marum
 Jolanda Slenter-Weijts
 Elvira Stinissen
 Josien ten Thije-Voortman
 Rika de Vries
 Petra Westerhof

Preliminary round - Group A

Group table

Semifinal

Bronze medal match

Swimming

7 competitors:

Men

Women

Table tennis

4 competitors:

Men

Women

Wheelchair basketball

12 competitors:

Women

 Barbara van Bergen
 Patries Boekhoorn
 Sandra Braam
 Petra Garnier
 Inge Huitzing
 Chèr Korver
 Roos Oosterbaan
 Elsbeth van Oostrom
 Fleur Pieterse
 Brenda Ramaekers
 Carina Versloot
 Jitske Visser

Preliminary round - Group B

Group table

Quarterfinal

Classification round

5th place game

Wheelchair tennis

11 competitors:

Men

Women

Mixed Doubles

See also
2008 Summer Paralympics
Netherlands at the Paralympics
Netherlands at the 2008 Summer Olympics

References

External links
Beijing 2008 Paralympic Games Official Site
International Paralympic Committee

Nations at the 2008 Summer Paralympics
2008
Paralympics